Premiere Stages is the professional Equity theater company in residence at Kean University. Founded in 2004, Premiere sponsors the Premiere Play Festival, a source for developing new plays. The winner of the festival receives a full-scale production as part of Premiere's season. The second-place finisher receives a staged reading to contribute to its further development. Apart from the festival winner, Premiere produces new works by established playwrights as well as established plays such as the 2006 Pulitzer Prize winning play Rabbit Hole by David Lindsay-Abaire. Premiere's presentation of Lost Boy Found in Whole Foods, by Tammy Ryan was produced in collaboration with the Kean Human Rights Institute and Newark's Darfur Rehabilitation Project.

Premiere Stages is a member of Theatre Communications Group and the New Jersey Theatre Alliance.

Selected alumni 
The following is a list of playwrights who have developed work through Premiere Stages.
 Keith Josef Adkins
 George Brant
 Deborah Brevoort
 Martin Casella
James Christy
 Hal Corley
 Kate Cortesi
Chris Cragin-Day
 Gino DiIorio
 Sarah Gancher
 Nick Gandiello
Craig Garcia
 Keelay Gipson
 Keli Goff
 Kathryn Grant
 Lindsey Ferrentino
 Willy Holtzman
 Kait Kerrigan
 Kimber Lee
 Rogelio Martínez
 Dominique Morisseau
 Deneen Reynolds-Knott
Tammy Ryan
 Jeff Talbott

References

External links 
 Premiere Stages at Kean
 Premiere Stages at the New Jersey Theatre Alliance
 Broadway World preview of The Good Counselor
 New York Times review of Premiere's production of John Wooten's Duck Crossing

Theatre companies in New Jersey
Kean University
Union Township, Union County, New Jersey